The 1967–68 Northern Football League season was the 71st in the history of Northern Football League, a football competition in England.

Clubs

Division One featured 18 clubs which competed in the league last season, no new clubs joined the league this season.

League table

References

Northern Football League seasons
1967–68 in English football leagues